Frank J. Bisignano (born August 9, 1959) is an American businessman and the President and CEO of Fiserv. He previously served as the CEO of First Data Corporation and the COO of JPMorgan Chase.

Career
Based in New York City, Bisignano started his career as VP of both Shearson Lehman Brothers and First Fidelity Bank. Starting in 1994, he held a number of executive positions at Citigroup, with American Banker writing that "he got his payments industry bona fides at Citi by running its massive global transaction services unit." In 2004 the publication Treasury and Risk named him one of the "100 most influential people in finance."

Hired as CAO of JPMorgan Chase in 2005, CEO Jamie Dimon "trusted him with integrating the bank’s purchases of a foundering Bear Stearns Cos. and bankrupt Washington Mutual Inc. during the crisis." Bisignano was also a primary negotiator in JPMorgan's acquisition of the Canary Wharf property in London, and CEO for several of JPMorgan's mortgage banking divisions. In 2012 he was promoted to co-COO, and the Financial Times called him "one of [JPMorgan]s most influential, yet least visible, executives."

In 2013 Bisignano became Chairman and CEO of First Data Corporation, and his tenure attracted a fair amount of coverage in the press. He oversaw a technological push at the company, and in 2014 First Data collaborated with Apple Inc. on Apple Pay. Bisignano is also on the boards of organizations such as Continuum Health Partners and the Metro Atlanta Chamber of Commerce. Following Fiserv's acquisition of First Data in 2019, Bisignano formally assumed the role of Fiserv CEO in July 2020.

A 2018 Bloomberg editorial suggested that in 2013, Bisignano might have been the source of a leak regarding a Federal investigation into possible manipulation of US energy markets by JP Morgan.

Bisignano is consistently rated as one of the highest-paid CEOs in the United States. In 2017, the New York Times reported that his compensation exceeded $100 million. His compensation was rated at approximately $40 million in 2019. In December of 2022 Bisignano signed a new contract with Fiserv to serve as president and CEO until 2027.

Politics
Bisignano is a long-time supporter of the Republican Party, and Donald Trump in particular. He has donated hundreds of thousands of dollars towards Republican campaigns, including a $125,000 contribution to Trump Victory in 2019.

References

External links

Frank Bisignano at First Data

American chief operating officers
Living people
1959 births
People from Mill Basin, Brooklyn
American people of Italian descent
Citigroup people
Businesspeople from New York (state)
American technology chief executives
American money managers
Baker University alumni